A proposition is a central concept in philosophy of language and related fields, often characterized as the primary bearer of truth or falsity. Propositions are also often characterized as being the kind of thing that declarative sentences denote. For instance the sentence "The sky is blue" denotes the proposition that the sky is blue. However, crucially, propositions are not themselves linguistic expressions. For instance, the English sentence "Snow is white" denotes the same proposition as the German sentence "Schnee ist weiß" even though the two sentences are not the same. Similarly, propositions can also be characterized as the objects of belief and other propositional attitudes. For instance if one believes that the sky is blue, what one believes is the proposition that the sky is blue.

Formally, propositions are often modeled as functions which map a possible world to a truth value. For instance, the proposition that the sky is blue can be modeled as a function which would return the truth value  if given the actual world as input, but would return  if given some alternate world where the sky is green. However, a number of alternative formalizations have been proposed, notably the structured propositions view.

Propositions have played a large role throughout the history of logic, linguistics, philosophy of language, and related disciplines. Some researchers have doubted whether a consistent definition of propositionhood is possible, David Lewis even remarking that "the conception we associate with the word ‘proposition’ may be something of a jumble of conflicting desiderata". The term is often used broadly and has been used to refer to various related concepts.

Historical usage

By Aristotle
Aristotelian logic identifies a categorical proposition as a sentence which affirms or denies a predicate of a subject, optionally with the help of a copula.  An Aristotelian proposition may take the form of "All men are mortal" or "Socrates is a man."  In the first example, the subject is "men", predicate is "mortal" and copula is "are", while in the second example, the subject is "Socrates", the predicate is "a man" and copula is "is".

By the logical positivists
Often, propositions are related to closed formulae (or logical sentence) to distinguish them from what is expressed by an open formula. In this sense, propositions are "statements" that are truth-bearers. This conception of a proposition was supported by the philosophical school of logical positivism.

Some philosophers argue that some (or all) kinds of speech or actions besides the declarative ones also have propositional content. For example, yes–no questions present propositions, being inquiries into the truth value of them. On the other hand, some signs can be declarative assertions of propositions, without forming a sentence nor even being linguistic (e.g. traffic signs convey definite meaning which is either true or false).

Propositions are also spoken of as the content of beliefs and similar intentional attitudes, such as desires, preferences, and hopes. For example,  "I desire that I have a new car," or "I wonder whether it will snow" (or, whether it is the case that "it will snow"). Desire, belief, doubt, and so on, are thus called propositional attitudes when they take this sort of content.

By Russell
Bertrand Russell held that propositions were structured entities with objects and properties as constituents. One important difference between Ludwig Wittgenstein's view (according to which a proposition is the set of possible worlds/states of affairs in which it is true) is that on the Russellian account, two propositions that are true in all the same states of affairs can still be differentiated. For instance, the proposition "two plus two equals four" is distinct on a Russellian account from the proposition "three plus three equals six". If propositions are sets of possible worlds, however, then all mathematical truths (and all other necessary truths) are the same set (the set of all possible worlds).

Relation to the mind
In relation to the mind, propositions are discussed primarily as they fit into propositional attitudes. Propositional attitudes are simply attitudes characteristic of folk psychology (belief, desire, etc.) that one can take toward a proposition (e.g. 'it is raining,' 'snow is white,' etc.). In English, propositions usually follow folk psychological attitudes by a "that clause" (e.g. "Jane believes that it is raining"). In philosophy of mind and psychology, mental states are often taken to primarily consist in propositional attitudes. The propositions are usually said to be the "mental content" of the attitude. For example, if Jane has a mental state of believing that it is raining, her mental content is the proposition 'it is raining.' Furthermore, since such mental states are about something (namely, propositions), they are said to be intentional mental states.

Explaining the relation of propositions to the mind is especially difficult for non-mentalist views of propositions, such as those of the logical positivists and Russell described above, and Gottlob Frege's view that propositions are Platonist entities, that is, existing in an abstract, non-physical realm. So some recent views of propositions have taken them to be mental. Although propositions cannot be particular thoughts since those are not shareable, they could be types of cognitive events or properties of thoughts (which could be the same across different thinkers).

Philosophical debates surrounding propositions as they relate to propositional attitudes have also recently centered on whether they are internal or external to the agent, or whether they are mind-dependent or mind-independent entities. For more, see the entry on internalism and externalism in philosophy of mind.

Treatment in logic

Aristotelian logic 

As noted above, in Aristotelian logic a proposition is a particular kind of sentence (a declarative sentence) that affirms or denies a predicate of a subject, optionally with the help of a copula. Aristotelian propositions take forms like "All men are mortal" and "Socrates is a man."

Syntactic characterization 

In modern logic, the term "proposition" is often used for sentences of a formal language. In this usage, propositions are formal syntactic objects which can be studied independently of the meaning they would receive from a semantics. Propositions are also called sentences, statements, statement forms, formulas, and well-formed formulas, though these terms are usually not synonymous within a single text. 

A formal language begins with different types of symbols. These types can include variables, operators, function symbols, predicate (or relation) symbols, quantifiers, and propositional constants.(Grouping symbols such as delimiters are often added for convenience in using the language, but do not play a logical role.) Symbols are concatenated together according to recursive rules, in order to construct strings to which truth-values will be assigned. The rules specify how the operators, function and predicate symbols, and quantifiers are to be concatenated with other strings. A proposition is then a string with a specific form. The form that a proposition takes depends on the type of logic.

The type of logic called propositional, sentential, or statement logic includes only operators and propositional constants as symbols in its language. The propositions in this language are propositional constants, which are considered atomic propositions, and composite (or compound) propositions, which are composed by recursively applying operators to propositions. Application here is simply a short way of saying that the corresponding concatenation rule has been applied.

The types of logics called predicate, quantificational, or n-order logic include variables, operators, predicate and function symbols, and quantifiers as symbols in their languages. The propositions in these logics are more complex. First, one typically starts by defining a term as follows:

 A variable, or
 A function symbol applied to the number of terms required by the function symbol's arity.

For example, if + is a binary function symbol and x, y, and z are variables, then x+(y+z) is a term, which might be written with the symbols in various orders. Once a term is defined, a proposition can then be defined as follows:

 A predicate symbol applied to the number of terms required by its arity, or
 An operator applied to the number of propositions required by its arity, or
 A quantifier applied to a proposition.

For example, if = is a binary predicate symbol and ∀ is a quantifier, then ∀x,y,z [(x = y) → (x+z = y+z)] is a proposition. This more complex structure of propositions allows these logics to make finer distinctions between inferences, i.e., to have greater expressive power.

Semantic characterization 

Propositions are standardly understood semantically as functions which take a possible world and return a truth value. Via the notion of a characteristic set, propositions can be modeled equivalently as a set of possible worlds, namely those where the proposition is true.

Numerous refinements and alternative notions of proposition-hood have been proposed including inquisitive propositions and structured propositions. Propositions are called structured propositions if they have constituents, in some broad sense. Assuming a structured view of propositions, one can distinguish between singular propositions (also Russellian propositions, named after Bertrand Russell) which are about a particular individual, general propositions, which are not about any particular individual, and particularized propositions, which are about a particular individual but do not contain that individual as a constituent.

Objections to propositions
Attempts to provide a workable definition of proposition include the following:
Two meaningful declarative sentences express the same proposition, if and only if they mean the same thing.
which defines proposition in terms of synonymity. For example, "Snow is white" (in English) and "Schnee ist weiß" (in German) are different sentences, but they say the same thing, so they express the same proposition. Another definition of proposition is:

Two meaningful declarative sentence-tokens express the same proposition, if and only if they mean the same thing.
Unfortunately, the above definitions can result in two identical sentences/sentence-tokens appearing to have the same meaning, and thus expressing the same proposition and yet having different truth-values, as in "I am Spartacus" said by Spartacus and said by John Smith, and "It is Wednesday" said on a Wednesday and on a Thursday. These examples reflect the problem of ambiguity in common language, resulting in a mistaken equivalence of the statements. “I am Spartacus” spoken by Spartacus is the declaration that the individual speaking is called Spartacus and it is true. When spoken by John Smith, it is a declaration about a different speaker and it is false. The term “I” means different things, so “I am Spartacus” means different things.

A related problem is when identical sentences have the same truth-value, yet express different propositions. The sentence “I am a philosopher” could have been spoken by both Socrates and Plato. In both instances, the statement is true, but means something different.

These problems are addressed in predicate logic by using a variable for the problematic term, so that “X is a philosopher” can have Socrates or Plato substituted for X, illustrating that “Socrates is a philosopher” and “Plato is a philosopher” are different propositions. Similarly, “I am Spartacus” becomes “X is Spartacus”, where X is replaced with terms representing the individuals Spartacus and John Smith.

In other words, the example problems can be averted if sentences are formulated with precision such that their terms have unambiguous meanings.

A number of philosophers and linguists claim that all definitions of a proposition are too vague to be useful. For them, it is just a misleading concept that should be removed from philosophy and semantics. W. V. Quine, who granted the existence of sets in mathematics, maintained that the indeterminacy of translation prevented any meaningful discussion of propositions, and that they should be discarded in favor of sentences. P. F. Strawson, on the other hand, advocated for the use of the term "statement".

See also

Categorical proposition
Main contention
Probabilistic proposition

References

External links

 
Logical expressions
Philosophy of language
Semantic units
Statements
Syntax (logic)
Semantics
Propositional attitudes
Mathematical logic
Propositional calculus
Ontology
Formal semantics (natural language)